Thiou of Morigny (Latin: Teulfus Mauriniacensis) was a 12th-century French chronicler.

Thiou was a monk in Morigny, and abbot of Saint-Crépin de Soissons from 1118 to 1136.

References

External links 
  Anno Domini MCXLVII Mauriniacensis Monasteri Chronicon
  Teulfus Mauriniacensis: Chronicon Ab Anno Christi 1108 Usque Ad Annum 1147 in Documenta Catholica Omnia
  Bibliography (down)
 A Translation of the Chronicle of the Abbey of Morigny, France, c. 1100-1150

1200s deaths
12th-century French historians
French chroniclers
French Christian monks
French abbots
Year of birth unknown
French male writers
12th-century Latin writers